Mossville is an unincorporated community in Newton County, Arkansas, United States. Mossville has an elevation of 2,267 feet.

Notes

Unincorporated communities in Newton County, Arkansas
Unincorporated communities in Arkansas